My Favorite Songwriter, Porter Wagoner is the tenth solo studio album by American singer-songwriter Dolly Parton. It was released on October 2, 1972, by RCA Victor.

This album was released on CD for the first time on August 17, 2010, along with 1970's The Fairest of Them All. The album was released as a digital download on January 11, 2011.

Critical reception

The review published in the October 14, 1972 issue of Billboard said, "Dolly Parton is coming on as the leading female country singer in the business. Here, she does "Lonely Comin' Down", "Do You Hear the Robins Sing", and "Still on Your Mind". "When I Sing for Him" is an  excellently done gospel tune. Another stirring LP from Dolly!"

Cashbox gave a positive review of the album: "Dolly Parton—which is more beautiful, her voice or her looks? Whatever the answer, the combination of the two is simply devastating! Dolly radiates her inner soul through both her looks and her voice, and has shown time and time again that purity of feeling wins out over flashy singing tricks—her talent stands the test of time. In her liner notes, Dolly emphatically states that Porter Wagoner is her favorite songwriter, and for that reason she has recorded an album of his songs exclusively. The team of Dolly's performance and Porter's writing is another "perfect combination." A superlative album."

Track listing

References

Dolly Parton albums
1972 albums
Albums produced by Bob Ferguson (music)
RCA Records albums